Persatuan Sepakbola Indonesia Ketapang  (simply known as Persikat Ketapang) is an Indonesian football club based in Ketapang Regency, West Kalimantan. They currently compete in the Liga 3 and their homeground is Tentemak Stadium.

Honours
 Liga 3 West Kalimantan
 Champion: 2019

References

External links

Football clubs in Indonesia
Football clubs in West Kalimantan
Association football clubs established in 1987
1987 establishments in Indonesia